Gangsterfilmen is a 1974 Swedish film directed by Lars G. Thelestam. It was entered into the 25th Berlin International Film Festival.

Cast
 Clu Gulager as Glenn Mortenson
 Ernst Günther as Anders Andersson
 Per Oscarsson as Johan Gustavsson
 Anne-Lise Gabold
 Lou Castel
 Hans Alfredson as Manager at the pool hall
 Gudrun Brost as Anna Nilsson
 Carl-Axel Heiknert as Nils Nilsson
 Peter Lindgren as Hans Nilsson
 Gunnar Olsson as Karl
 Elina Salo
 Ulla Sjöblom as Kristina Nordbäck
 Inga Tidblad as Major's wife
 Marvin Yxner as Policeman

References

External links

Swedish crime drama films
1970s Swedish-language films
1970s Swedish films